New York State Rifle & Pistol Association, Inc. v. Bruen, 597 U.S. ___ (2022), abbreviated NYSRPA v. Bruen and also known as NYSRPA II or Bruen to distinguish it from the 2020 case, is a landmark decision of the United States Supreme Court related to the Second Amendment to the United States Constitution. The case concerned the constitutionality of the 1911 Sullivan Act, a New York State law requiring applicants for a license to carry a concealed pistol on their person to show "proper cause", or a special need distinguishable from that of the general public, in their application.

In a 6–3 decision, the majority ruled that New York's law was unconstitutional, and ruled that the ability to carry a pistol in public was a constitutional right under the Second Amendment. The majority ruled that states are allowed to enforce "shall-issue" permitting, where applicants for concealed carry permits must satisfy certain objective criteria, such as passing a background check, but that "may-issue" systems that use "arbitrary" evaluations of need made by local authorities are unconstitutional.

In wake of Bruen, several lawsuits involving federal and states' gun regulations have been filed, stressing on the judiciary need to evaluate the regulation not in consideration of the public good, but in light of the "historical tradition of firearm regulation", a phrase penned by majority opinion author Justice Clarence Thomas. Several of these cases had successfully overturned long-standing regulations due to the regulations being not of historic tradition.

Background

Prior Second Amendment case law 

The issue around the right to carry guns in public in the United States has been a contested area in politics and constitutional law for most of the 20th and, so far, the 21st century. Prior to the case, the Supreme Court established two major decisions toward gun possession in one's home: District of Columbia v. Heller affirmed that U.S. citizens did have an individual right, unconnected to a "well-regulated militia", to possess guns within their own homes under the Second Amendment, and McDonald v. City of Chicago affirmed this was a right that was incorporated against the states. However, the question of ownership outside of one's home had not yet reached the Supreme Court, and instead was based on an inconsistent framework of state laws and federal court decisions. These decisions were generally rested on long-standing common law that the government does have the ability to regulate firearms in public spaces to uphold state regulations on public gun possession. Across over one thousand cases since Heller, most federal appeals courts have used intermediate scrutiny rather than strict scrutiny to judge the validity of public-carry gun control laws which defer to the states' compelling interest to protect the public by restricting possession of guns in public spaces.

Since Heller and McDonald, the Supreme Court had been pressed by gun-rights advocates like the National Rifle Association to further review Second Amendment rights related to public possession of guns, but the Court had passed on numerous cases that were presented. The case New York State Rifle & Pistol Association Inc. v. City of New York, which dealt with transporting guns out of New York City, had been accepted by the Supreme Court in 2019, but due to changes in the underlying law, the case was rendered moot.

Case background 

To combat growing criminal violence in certain neighborhoods of New York City, including the assassination attempt on New York City mayor William J. Gaynor and the murder of author David Graham Phillips, Timothy Sullivan led the state legislature to enact the Sullivan Act in 1911. It made the possession of a handgun without a permit a crime, and instituted issuance of concealed carry permits at the discretion of local law enforcement. The law states that to obtain a permit, the applicant must "demonstrate a special need for self-protection distinguishable from that of the general community or of persons engaged in the same profession". The state had clarified that this must be a non-speculative need for self-defense as to establish a proper cause to grant a permit. The New York State Rifle and Pistol Association, along with Robert Nash and Brandon Koch, who failed to obtain a permit in New York state, challenged that law, seeking to make the issue of permits no longer discretionary. Nash, for example, sought a permit for a handgun after a string of robberies in his neighborhood but was denied as he could not prove a need for self-defense. The plaintiffs argued that the law and judgements against their permits were flawed; "Good, even impeccable, moral character plus a simple desire to exercise a fundamental right is, according to these courts, not sufficient. Nor is living or being employed in a 'high crime area.'" The Sullivan Act is considered the first may-issue public carry law in the United States, since the discretion on allowing a person to carry a gun in public is based on the evaluation of need, which seven other states adopted from New York. This is in contrast to more recent "shall-issue" licensing requirements based on determinant methods such as using background checks and aptitude checks to determine eligibility.

Lower courts 

The case, filed against then-Superintendent George P. Beach II of the New York State Police and Justice Richard J. McNally of the New York Supreme Court, was initially dismissed at the Northern District of New York in 2018. The plaintiffs appealed to the Second Circuit, which affirmed the dismissal by the District Court in August 2020. Beach was replaced by Keith M. Corlett in 2019; Corlett was replaced by Kevin P. Bruen in 2021, and Bruen was subsequently named as the defendant and respondent in the suit.

Supreme Court 

The petitioners had asked the Supreme Court to review their case, specifically pressing the question of "whether the Second Amendment allows the government to prohibit ordinary law-abiding citizens from carrying handguns outside the home for self-defense". The Supreme Court granted certiorari on April 26, 2021, though it limited the case to the question of "whether the State’s denial of petitioners’ applications for concealed-carry licenses for self-defense violated the Second Amendment". The case was heard on November 3, 2021. The petitioners were represented by Paul Clement, who served as solicitor general during the administration of George W. Bush and argued as amicus curiae on behalf of the United States in Heller, and on behalf of the National Rifle Association in support of the petitioners in McDonald. The respondents were represented by New York State Solicitor General Barbara Underwood, who served in the Solicitor General's Office during the administration of Bill Clinton and temporarily served as
acting Solicitor General of the United States between the transition from Clinton to Bush.

The case was the first major gun-rights case that the Supreme Court had heard in more than a decade, outside of the moot New York State Rifle & Pistol Association Inc. v. City of New York. It was also the first gun-rights case to be heard by the six-member conservative majority, which included Justices Clarence Thomas, Neil Gorsuch and Brett Kavanaugh, who in prior opinions had emphasized the need for the Supreme Court to review the current stance on Second Amendment cases. Justice Amy Coney Barrett had also expressed support for a Second Amendment review prior to her appointment to the Supreme Court. Because of the shift toward a more-conservative membership, some court analysts believed that the Court might interpret the Second Amendment more liberally in favor of individual rights over states' powers, which could render many existing public-possession regulations unconstitutional. However, as discussed by Vox Ian Millhiser, the limited question that the Court granted may restrict the issue to concealed-carry licenses and not the matter of any and all public possession.

Amicus briefs 

More than eighty amici curiae for this case were filed.

Discrimination and marginalized groups 

Organizations representing American minority groups submitted amicus briefs in support of striking down much of the Sullivan Act as unconstitutional. The Bronx Defenders, Brooklyn Defenders Services, and Black Attorneys of Legal Aid opined that the Second Amendment is a "legal fiction" in New York when it comes to people of color. According to these public defender and legal aid organizations, some 96% of those arrested for illegal gun possession in New York during 2020 were either Black or Latino.  The disparate racial impact of the Sullivan Act and other discretionary New York state gun control regulations is "no accident" according to their brief provided to the Court. Black Guns Matter, A Girl & A Gun Women's Shooting League, and Armed Equality, an LGBT self-defense group, voiced a similar opinion to the Court in their own amicus brief, calling may-issue "deeply discriminatory".

Weakness of "proper cause" 
Twenty-six state attorneys general argued that the subjective nature of the proper-cause test "fails muster under any level of scrutiny" because it required license applicants to prove they "have already become victims of violent crimes" before they could carry a firearm to protect themselves against that very violence from occurring in the first place.

Black Guns Matter opined the proper-cause requirement had no objective standards, and therefore lent itself to discriminatory usage in practice.

History and Precedent 
A group of Republican lawyers including J. Michael Luttig, Peter Keisler, and Stuart M. Gerson argued that text, history, tradition, and precedent make it clear that states may restrict concealed carry and pass legislation to reduce gun violence in public.

Opinion of the Court

The case's decision was released on June 23, 2022. In a 6–3 opinion authored by Justice Clarence Thomas, the Court held that the state law was unconstitutional as it infringed on the right to keep and bear arms, reversing the Second Circuit's decision and remanding the case for further review. 

Thomas' majority opinion, joined by Chief Justice John Roberts and Justices Samuel Alito, Neil Gorsuch, Brett Kavanaugh, and Amy Coney Barrett, effectively rendered public carry a constitutional right under the Second Amendment. Thomas wrote, "The constitutional right to bear arms in public for self-defense is not 'a second-class right, subject to an entirely different body of rules than the other Bill of Rights guarantees.' We know of no other constitutional right that an individual may exercise only after demonstrating to government officers some special need." 

Because public carry is a constitutional right, Thomas ruled out use of the two-part test to evaluate state gun laws, which generally involved application of intermediate scrutiny, that many lower courts had used, and instead evaluated New York's law under a more-stringent test of whether the proper-cause requirement is consistent with the nation's historical tradition of firearm regulation. Thomas wrote that gun control laws that identify restricted "sensitive places", such as courthouses and polling places, would still likely pass constitutional muster, though urban areas would not qualify as such sensitive places. 

After striking down the two-step test (formerly used by Courts of Appeals addressing Second Amendment issues), Bruen identified the new test courts must use on Second Amendment cases. The Court held: "When the Second Amendment's plain text covers an individual's conduct [here the right to bear arms], the Constitution presumptively protects that conduct. The government must then justify its regulation by demonstrating that it is consistent with the Nation's historical tradition of firearm regulation. Only then may a court conclude that the individual's conduct falls outside the Second Amendment's "'unqualified command.'"

Concurrence
Justice Kavanaugh penned a concurring opinion, joined by Chief Justice Roberts, affirming states may still implement licensing requirements such as background checks before issuing public carry permits. Kavanaugh wrote that these checks differ from the New York law as that law "grants open-ended discretion to licensing officials and authorizes licenses only for those applicants who can show some special need apart from self-defense." Kavanaugh quoted from Justice Antonin Scalia's majority opinion in Heller, stating that "nothing in our opinion, should be taken to cast doubt on longstanding prohibitions on the possession of firearms by felons and the mentally ill, or laws forbidding the carrying of firearms in sensitive places such as schools and government buildings, or laws imposing conditions and qualifications on the commercial sale of arms."

Dissent
Justice Stephen Breyer wrote the dissenting opinion, joined by Justices Sonia Sotomayor and Elena Kagan. Breyer led his dissent by referring the amount of gun violence in the United States, including listing out several major mass shootings from the months prior. He subsequently wrote that "New York's Legislature considered the empirical evidence about gun violence and adopted a reasonable licensing law to regulate the concealed carriage of handguns in order to keep the people of New York safe", and that the majority decision established a new framework for courts to use in Second Amendments cases that would harm states' abilities to regulate guns.

Criticism of dissent

Justice Alito wrote a separate concurrence to the majority, in which he criticized Breyer's dissent, stating, "It is hard to see what legitimate purpose can possibly be served by most of the dissent's lengthy introductory section ... Much of the dissent seems designed to obscure the specific question that the Court has decided." Dismissing Breyer's concern on a new legal framework for Second Amendment cases, Alito wrote, "Our holding decides nothing about who may lawfully possess a firearm or the requirements that must be met to buy a gun."
Justice Alito also questioned whether a person bent on committing an atrocity such as a mass shooting would be deterred because it would be illegal for him to carry a firearm outside of his home. Alito further pointed out that the recent shooting rampage in Buffalo occurred in New York, and New York's law had done nothing to stop the perpetrator.

Impact 

While the ruling directly applied only to New York's law, legal analysts and lawmakers expected the ruling to be used to challenge the "may-issue" gun regulations in California, Hawaii, Maryland, Massachusetts, New Jersey, and Rhode Island. Lawmakers in New York and these states began evaluating new regulations that would comply with the Supreme Court ruling while maintaining strict ownership laws.

On June 24, 2022, the Acting Attorney General of New Jersey, Matthew J. Platkin, concluded that Bruen disallowed the state from requiring concealed carry permit applicants to demonstrate a justifiable need to carry a handgun and directed law enforcement and prosecutors to process applications on a shall-issue basis. The Attorneys General of California and Hawaii issued similar directives.

Within months of the ruling of Bruen, several existing and new lawsuit challenging federal and states' firearms regulations pressed on the language of "historical tradition of firearm regulation" that was introduced in Thomas' majority opinion, and to ignore the traditional metric of whether the restriction serves the public good. Among federal laws that have been blocked from enforcement as of February 2023 include those that prevented gun ownership from those convicted of misdemeanor domestic violence, individuals subject to final (issued after a hearing of which the respondent had notice and at which the respondent had the opportunity to appear) domestic violence restraining orders, felony defendants, and drug users. These decisions have been praised by Second Amendment activists but criticized by those fighting for stronger gun control in the U.S. The interpretations of Bruen have been considered varied by judges and legal scholars, since interpreting the "historic tradition" requires judges to understand how the framers of the Constitution envisioned gun ownership in the 18th century.

Reactions 
The Governor of New York, Kathy Hochul, called the decision by the court "frightening" and said it "strips away the state's right to protect its citizens". She also criticized the decision as "reckless" and "reprehensible". By July 1, 2022, Hochul signed a revised Concealed Carry Improvement Act (CCIA) into law with restrictions on public possession of guns based on the decision from Bruen. The new law removes the old "may-issue" standard that had been challenged, but adds new requirements including classroom training and a background check of the applicant's social media posts for any red flags. In addition, the law prohibits guns from being carried in sensitive locations that include polling places, schools, and churches, and well as New York's tourist attractions like Times Square. The law came into effect on September 1, 2022; an initial lawsuit seeking to block enforcement of the law was thrown out due to lack of standing though federal judge Glenn Suddaby did agree the new law may be unconstitutional under the Bruen decision. A second lawsuit, filed by citizens that belonged to Gun Owners of America, led to Judge Suddaby to grant an injunction on the law on October 6, 2022, stating that the law's full list of locations where public carry was banned was likely indefensible, though the state filed an emergency appeal to the Second Circuit. The Second Circuit lifted the injunction, allowing the law to be enforced, while they reviewed their case.

Separately, New York City passed a bill on October 11, 2022, that designated Times Square as a sensitive location where public possession of a gun would be unlawful.

The Legal Aid Society said the decision "may be an affirmative step toward ending arbitrary licensing standards that have inhibited lawful Black and Brown gun ownership in New York."

House minority Leader Kevin McCarthy supported the ruling, saying it "rightfully ensures the right of all law-abiding Americans to defend themselves without unnecessary government interference."

Law professor Steve Vladeck said the decision will "have monumental ramifications far beyond carrying firearms in public" and predicts there will be a "slew of litigation challenging any and every gun-control measure".

References

Further reading

External links 
  
 S.51001 Concealed Carry Improvement Act from the New York State Senate

2022 in United States case law
United States Supreme Court cases
United States Supreme Court cases of the Roberts Court
United States Second Amendment case law
New York (state) law